"A Story about a Darning-needle" or The Darning-Needle is an 1845 literary fairy tale by Hans Christian Andersen

External links

"The Darning-Needle". 

1845 works
Short stories by Hans Christian Andersen